Joseph Louis Cofer (born March 5, 1963) is a former American football defensive back in the National Football League for the Washington Redskins.  He is best known as one of the 1987 replacement players for the Washington Redskins. His breakup of a Danny White pass sealed a Redskins victory in 1987 that moved Washington into first place in the division. He played college football at the University of Tennessee.

1963 births
Living people
Tennessee Volunteers football players
American football safeties
Washington Redskins players
Players of American football from Knoxville, Tennessee
National Football League replacement players